The Council for New England was a 17th-century English joint stock company that was granted a royal charter to found colonial settlements along the coast of North America. The Council was established in November of 1620, and was disbanded (although with no apparent changes in land titles) in 1635. It provided for the establishment of the Plymouth Colony, the Province of New Hampshire, the Massachusetts Bay Colony, the New Haven Colony, and the Province of Maine. It was largely the creation of Sir Ferdinand Gorges.

Some of the persons involved had previously received a charter in 1606 as the Plymouth Company and had founded the short-lived Popham Colony within the territory of northern Virginia (actually in present-day Maine in the United States). The company had fallen into disuse following the abandonment of the 1607 colony. The Council was re-established after, with support from Gorges, (1) Captain John Smith had completed a thorough survey of the Atlantic side of New England (and named it such), (2) Richard Vines over-wintered in 1616, off the Maine coast and discovered that a plague was decimating Native Americans and (3) a friendly English speaking local Native American had been placed in the most likely colonization spot. 

In the new 1620 charter granted by James I, the company was given rights of settlement in the area now designated as New England, which was the land previously part of the Virginia Colony north of the 40th parallel, and extending to the 48th parallel. In 1622 the Plymouth Council issued a land grant to John Mason which ultimately evolved into the Province of New Hampshire.

1620 Charter

The Charter of 1620 establishes the wish for English colonization of all land between degrees "34 and 44". The colonial plantation was to found settlements and commerce for Christian peoples and establish trade and commerce between these new colonies and the colonies of George Somers and Thomas Gates (Virginia Colony). These new colonies were to be managed by Gentry from Plymouth, Exeter, and Bristol. These members of the Council were to have, in perpetuity for them and their descendants, rights and privileges extended for the governance and management of trade of the colony.   

Individuals listed as beneficiaries of the charter include:
 Ludovic Stewart, 2nd Duke of Lennox
 George Villiers, 1st Duke of Buckingham
 William Herbert, 3rd Earl of Pembroke
 Thomas Howard, 14th Earl of Arundel
 William Alexander, 1st Earl of Stirling
 James Hamilton, 2nd Marquess of Hamilton
 Henry Wriothesley, 3rd Earl of Southampton
 Robert Rich, 2nd Earl of Warwick
 John Ramsay, 1st Earl of Holderness
 Edward la Zouche, 11th Baron Zouche
 Edmund Sheffield, 1st Baron Sheffield
 Baron Gorges of Dundalk
 Robert Carr, 1st Earl of Somerset
 Robert Mansell
 Edward Zouch
 Dudley Digges
 Thomas Roe
 Ferdinando Gorges
 Francis Popham
 John Brooke, 1st Baron Cobham
 Richard Hawkins
 Allen Apsley
 Sir Warwick Hale
 Sir Richard Catchmay
 Sir John Bourchier
 Nathaniel Rich
 Edward Giles
 Giles Mompesson
 Thomas Wroth
 Matthew Sutcliffe
 Robert Heath
 John Drake
 Raleigh Gilbert
 George Chudley
 Thomas Hamon
 John Argall

The Council would have full legal rights of governance and administration over the colonial plantation. The members of the Council would elect a President to oversee administrative affairs.

1635 revocation

With the establishment of the Plymouth Colony, Massachusetts Bay Colony, Province of New Hampshire, Saybrook Colony, and New Haven Colony, the council was disbanded by Royal Charter.

References

External links
1620 Charter of New England from the Avalon Project
1635 Surrender of the New England Charter from the Avalon Project

History of the Thirteen Colonies
History of New England
1620 establishments in the Thirteen Colonies
1635 disestablishments in the Thirteen Colonies
Colonial United States (British)